Holzheim is a municipality in the district of Dillingen in Bavaria. Until its demolition in 1811, Fultenbach Abbey stood in the town.

References

Dillingen (district)